Chang-lin Tien  (July 24, 1935 – October 29, 2002) was a Chinese-American professor of mechanical engineering and university administrator. He was the seventh chancellor of the University of California, Berkeley (1990–1997), and in that capacity was the first person of Asian descent to head a major research university in the United States.

Biography

Early years
Born in Huangpi, Hubei, China, Tien and his family fled to Taiwan in 1949 at the end of the Chinese Civil War. He earned a BS in mechanical engineering from the National Taiwan University in 1955 and went on to a fellowship at the University of Louisville in 1956, where he received an MME in heat transfer in 1957. He then earned his MA and PhD degrees in mechanical engineering from Princeton University in 1959.

Career
Tien joined UC Berkeley faculty as an assistant professor of mechanical engineering in 1959, and three years later, at the age of 26, became the youngest professor ever to be honored with UC Berkeley's Distinguished Teaching Award. He was promoted to full professor in 1968 and served as the chair of the Department of Mechanical Engineering from 1974 to 1981. From 1983 to 1985, he served as vice chancellor of research. Tien spent his entire career at Berkeley, except for 1988–90 when he was executive vice-chancellor of UC Irvine. In 1999, Tien received the prestigious title of "University Professor".

Tien was an expert in thermal science and researched on thermal radiation, thermal insulation, microscale thermal phenomena, fluid flow, phase-change energy transfer, heat pipes, reactor safety, cryogenics, and fire phenomena, authoring more than 300 research journal and monograph articles, 16 edited volumes, and one book. Up until 2005, his work was posthumously published in the Annual Review of Heat Transfer.

As chancellor, Tien was a leading supporter of affirmative action. After the Regents banned the use of racial preferences in 1995 for university admissions, Tien launched the "Berkeley Pledge," an outreach program designed to recruit disadvantaged students from the state's public schools. Amid an 18% budget cut, Tien launched "The Promise of Berkeley – Campaign for the New Century", a fundraising drive that raised $1.44 billion. In December 1996, President Bill Clinton put him on the shortlist of candidates for United States Secretary of Energy, but Tien was removed after the Chinese campaign finance scandal made headlines; the unsealed Federal Bureau of Investigation file for Tien showed he had been investigated as a potential foreign agent as early as 1973, but no evidence ever was found to support this assumption.

Known for his "Go Bears!" spirit, Tien was very popular with students, often showing up at student rallies and sporting events wearing his "Cal" baseball cap. He was commonly seen picking up trash in Sproul Plaza, appearing in the library in the middle of the night during finals week, or checking up on students in the residence halls and classrooms.

After stepping down from the chancellorship in 1997, Tien was appointed to the National Science Board and the National Commission on Mathematics and Science Teaching for the 21st Century in 1999. He was diagnosed with brain cancer in 2000 and suffered a stroke during surgery to treat it, prompting his resignation in 2001.

Tien was a member of the National Academy of Engineering, the Academia Sinica (in Taiwan), the American Academy of Arts and Sciences, the American Association for the Advancement of Science, the American Institute of Aeronautics and Astronautics, the American Society of Mechanical Engineers, and the Chinese Academy of Sciences (in mainland China).

Personal life
During his residency in the United States, Tien became an American citizen.

Shortly before instruction for the 1992–93 academic year started, a young woman named Rosebud Denovo was killed by police after she broke into University House, the chancellor's residence, during an apparent assassination attempt. Tien and his family were unharmed.

Tien died in Redwood City, California at the age of 67. A brain tumor had forced him into hospitalization two years earlier; while hospitalized, he suffered a stroke from which he never fully recovered. He was survived by his wife Di-Hwa, his son Norman Tien, currently Dean of the Faculty of Engineering at the University of Hong Kong since June 2012, and daughters Christine Tien, Stockton's deputy city manager, and Dr. Phyllis Tien, a UC San Francisco physician.

Legacy

 Asteroid "Tienchanglin" (formerly #3643), discovered by the Zi Jin Mountain Observatory in China in 1978, was formally named for the former chancellor in 1999.
 Oil tanker  was christened in 2000 for the Chevron Corporation. It was subsequently renamed to  after being sold to Space Shipping in 2003, then  after being sold to Maran Tankers in 2014.
 The Tien Center for East Asian Studies at UC Berkeley opened in 2008.

 Asian Pacific Fund's Chang-Lin Tien Award.

References

External links
 

1935 births
2002 deaths
Leaders of the University of California, Berkeley
Chinese emigrants to the United States
Members of the United States National Academy of Engineering
Foreign members of the Chinese Academy of Sciences
National Taiwan University alumni
People from Wuhan
Princeton University alumni
Recipients of the Grand Bauhinia Medal
American people of Taiwanese descent
UC Berkeley College of Engineering faculty
University of Louisville alumni
Members of Academia Sinica
Educators from Hubei
Scientists from Hubei
Chinese Civil War refugees
Taiwanese people from Hubei
Foreign members of the Chinese Academy of Engineering
20th-century American academics